Utricularia stellaris is a medium to large sized suspended aquatic carnivorous plant that belongs to the genus Utricularia. U. stellaris is native to Africa, tropical Asia, and northern Australia.

See also 
 List of Utricularia species

References

External links

Carnivorous plants of Africa
Carnivorous plants of Asia
Carnivorous plants of Australia
Flora of Africa
Flora of the Indian subcontinent
Flora of Myanmar
Flora of Vietnam
Flora of Queensland
Flora of the Northern Territory
Eudicots of Western Australia
Lamiales of Australia
stellaris